Miracanthops eseejja is a species of praying mantis in the family Acanthopidae that is native to Peru. It was first described in 2005 by Peruvian entomologist Julio Rivera.

References

Acanthopidae
Mantodea of South America
Fauna of Peru
Insects described in 2005